Tegostoma sarobiella is a moth in the family Crambidae. It was described by Hans Georg Amsel in 1970 and is found in Afghanistan.

References

Odontiini
Moths described in 1970
Moths of Asia
Taxa named by Hans Georg Amsel